The 2023 Emmanuel Lions men's volleyball team represents Emmanuel College (Georgia) in the 2023 NCAA Division I & II men's volleyball season. The Lions, led by fifth year head coach James Friddle, were picked to finish fifth in the Conference Carolinas coaches preseason poll.

Season highlights
Will be filled in as the season progresses.

Roster

Schedule
TV/Internet Streaming information:
All home games will be streamed on Conference Carolinas DN. Most road games will also be televised or streamed by the schools television or streaming service.

 *-Indicates conference match.
 Times listed are Eastern Time Zone.

Announcers for televised games
Tusculum: No commentary
UC Irvine: Rob Espero & Charlie Brande
Pepperdine: Al Epstein
The Master's: Dave Caldwell
UC San Diego: Bryan Fenley & Ricci Luyties
Fort Valley State:
Fort Valley State: 
King: 
Lees-McRae: 
Limestone: 
Mount Olive: 
Barton  
Belmont Abbey: 
North Greenville: 
Maryville: 
Missouri S&T: 
Lincoln Memorial: 
Tusculum: 
Erskine: 
Barton: 
Mount Olive: 
Lees-McRae:
King: 
Lincoln Memorial: 
Limestone:
Belmont Abbey: 
North Greenville: 
Erskine:

References

2023 in sports in Georgia (U.S. state)
2023 NCAA Division I & II men's volleyball season
Emmanuel